Jorge R. Gutierrez (born January 25, 1975) is a Mexican animator, writer, producer, director, and voice actor. He co-created (with wife, Sandra Equihua) the Annie and Emmy Award-winning Nicktoon El Tigre: The Adventures of Manny Rivera, co-wrote and directed the Annie Award-winning The Book of Life, which was nominated for a Golden Globe Award for Best Animated Feature Film, wrote and directed the Annie and Emmy nominated Son of Jaguar VR short for Google, and most recently wrote and directed the Annie and Emmy Award-winning limited series Maya and the Three for Netflix Animation.

Biography
Born in 1975 in Mexico City and raised in Tijuana, Gutierrez has completed various films, cartoons, illustrations and paintings exploring his love of Mexican pop and folk culture.

Gutierrez attended the California Institute of the Arts (CalArts), where he received his BFA (1997) & MFA (2000) in Experimental Animation under Jules Engel, and was mentored by Maureen Selwood. There he created the 3D short Carmelo, which won the 2001 Student Emmy Award in animation and was screened at Kodak's Emerging Filmmakers Program at the 2001 Cannes Film Festival. In 2000, Gutierrez worked under animator Maurice Noble, for the art direction of Chuck Jones' Timberwolf for Warner Bros. In 2001, he began creating Jorge Gutierrez' El Macho, an animated web series for Sony Pictures.

Gutierrez has also done character design on many animated series including Nickelodeon's ChalkZone, as well as Kids' WB's ¡Mucha Lucha!, Cartoon Network's Class of 3000, and Disney's The Buzz on Maggie for which he was nominated for a 2006 Annie Award in character design. As a writer, he's worked on Scholastic's Maya & Miguel as well as Disney's Brandy & Mr. Whiskers and Vampirina.

In 2008, Gutierrez won two Annie awards (Best TV Animated Show & Best TV Character Design) and one Emmy (Best TV Character Design) working on his passion project for Nickelodeon, El Tigre: The Adventures of Manny Rivera, along with his co-creator and wife, Sandra Equihua who also won an Emmy for her character designs.

In 2010, he created some of the sketches in Cartoon Network's Mad including "Dear Reaper...", "Dog vs Mailman" (part 1, 2 and 3), "Video Game Cheats", "Arcade Boy" and "Dog vs Fire Hydrant".

In 2012, Gutierrez directed and co-wrote a computer-animated adventure feature film with a Romeo and Juliet style love story set against a Mexican "Day of the Dead" backdrop. The film, with the official title The Book of Life, was co-produced with 20th Century Fox Animation and was released on October 17, 2014. He earned his first Golden Globe Award nomination for Best Animated Feature Film in 2014. He was also nominated for three Annie awards (Best Film, Best Director & Best Character Design).

In February 2015, Reel FX and Gutierrez announced a multi-year, multi-picture deal which included Kung Fu Space Punch and The Book of Life 2.

In 2016 Gutierrez designed, voiced, wrote and directed the Annie and Emmy nominated Son of Jaguar VR short for Google Spotlight Stories.

In 2016, Gutierrez was awarded an Impact Award by the National Hispanic Media Coalition for his “Outstanding Direction in a Motion Picture”.

On August 2, 2017, it was reported that Gutierrez would write and direct The Billion Brick Race, a spin-off of The Lego Movie, for Warner Animation Group. However, on February 8, 2018, it was reported that Gutierrez had left the project.

In October 2020, he signed an over-all-deal with Netflix Animation. He directed the Immigration music video for the Emmy Award-winning series We the People, and wrote and directed the Annie (Best TV Animated Show & Best TV Music) and Emmy (Best Writing, Best Promo, Best Sound and Induvial Achievement for Color) Award-winning Maya and the Three, a nine episode animated limited series for Netflix Animation. His next project for the platform is an original animated film titled I, Chihuahua with Gabriel "Fluffy" Iglesias.

Personal life
Gutierrez did not speak until the age of five. As an adult, he was diagnosed with autism following his son's diagnosis.

Filmography

Film

Television

Bibliography

References

External links

 
 

1975 births
Living people
Annie Award winners
California Institute of the Arts alumni
People from Tijuana
Artists from Baja California
Artists from Mexico City
Emmy Award winners
Mexican illustrators
Mexican culture
Nickelodeon Animation Studio people
Netflix people
Showrunners
El Tigre: The Adventures of Manny Rivera
Actors with autism
Artists with autism